Balanophorus is a genus of beetles belonging to the family Melyridae.

Species: The genus was first described by William John Macleay in 1872.

Balanophorus ater 
Balanophorus biplagiatus 
Balanophorus brevipennis 
Balanophorus concinnus 
Balanophorus inaequalis 
Balanophorus janthinipennis 
Balanophorus macleayi 
Balanophorus mastersii 
Balanophorus megalops 
Balanophorus notaticollis 
Balanophorus pictus 
Balanophorus scapulatus 
Balanophorus victoriensis

References

Melyridae
Cleroidea genera